Ellen and Charles F. Welles House, also known as "The Old Red House," "Grovedale Farm," and Homer P. Dean Funeral Home, is a historic home located in Wyalusing Township, Bradford County, Pennsylvania. The original house was built about 1822, and is a transitional brick Greek Revival-style dwelling. A -story frame Queen Anne-style addition built in 1894.  Also on the property are a small frame barn (c. 1870), a large frame barn and carriage barn (c. 1850), corn crib (c. 1900), and small frame tenant house (c. 1890).

It was added to the National Register of Historic Places in 1999, with a boundary increase in 2000.

References

Houses on the National Register of Historic Places in Pennsylvania
Greek Revival houses in Pennsylvania
Queen Anne architecture in Pennsylvania
Houses completed in 1822
Houses in Bradford County, Pennsylvania
National Register of Historic Places in Bradford County, Pennsylvania
1822 establishments in Pennsylvania